Glyaden is a rural locality (a selo) and the administrative center of Glyadensky Selsoviet, Blagoveshchensky District, Altai Krai, Russia. The population was 684 as of 2013. There are 6 streets.

Geography 
Glyaden is located 40 km southeast of Blagoveshchenka (the district's administrative centre) by road. Glyaden-2 is the nearest rural locality.

References 

Rural localities in Blagoveshchensky District, Altai Krai